The Maratha Warriors were a field hockey team from Maharashtra, India that competed in the now defunct Premier Hockey League.

Team Lineup

Players
Squad

Note: The list of players was obtained from the PHL website. The list may change in the near future.

Other Important Team Personnel

   Mukul Pandey (Head Coach) 
   Murugappan (Asst. Coach) 
   James Peter Ekka (General Manager) 
   Ramesh Pillai (Trainer)

Ex-players

Dhanraj Pillay

Results

Note:- ET is win/loss in extra time

Indian field hockey clubs
Premier Hockey League teams
Sports clubs in India
2005 establishments in Maharashtra
Sports clubs established in 2005